Phyllonorycter connexella is a moth of the family Gracillariidae. It is found from Fennoscandia to the Pyrenees and Italy and from France to central Russia and Ukraine.

The larvae feed on Populus alba, Populus x canadensis,  P. nigra (including its cultivar, 'Italica'), Salix alba, Salix x fragilis, S. pentandra and S. purpurea. They mine the leaves of their host plant. They create tentiform mines on the underside of the leaf, usually between two side veins. Mines characteristically have a single strong central fold down their length. Frass is visible in the mine as two distinct dark longitudinal lines, which then form the lateral borders of the cocoon as it develops. Pupation occurs within this cocoon.

References

connexella
Moths of Europe
Moths described in 1846